Pallak Lalwani (born 1 January 1996) is an Indian actress who appears in Telugu and Tamil-language films.

Early life 
Her father Jiten Lalwani is an Indian television actor who works in Hindi language television series.

Career 
She made her debut with the Telugu film Abbayitho Ammayi with Naga Shourya. In 2018, Palak Lalwani featured in a music video Dil Zaffran along with Rahat Fateh Ali Khan, composed by Ravi Shankar and directed by Kamal Chandra. In 2018, she starred in Juvva. In a review of the film by Telangana Today, the reviewer wrote that "Palak Lalwani looks glamorous and fits well in the role of a bubbly girl".

In March 2019, Lalwani starred in Crazy Crazy Feeling with Viswant Duddumpudi. She made her Tamil debut in Baba Bhaskar's Kuppathu Raja in 2019. Lalwani played a North Madras girl in the film. Later that year, she played a journalist in Sixer with Vaibhav. Her upcoming films include Sinam with Arun Vijay and Partner with Aadhi Pinisetty and Hansika Motwani.

Filmography

References

External links
 

Indian film actresses
Actresses in Telugu cinema
Living people
21st-century Indian actresses
Actresses in Tamil cinema
1996 births